Crüe Fest 2 was the second year of the Crüe Fest touring festival, created and headlined by Mötley Crüe. The tour took place over the summer of 2009, and was in the same vein as the first Crüe Fest.

Line up
On March 16, 2009, the line up for Crüe Fest 2 was announced at a press conference at the Fuse TV studio in New York City. The bands were confirmed to be Charm City Devils, Drowning Pool, Godsmack, and Theory of a Deadman, in addition to Mötley Crüe themselves.

Nikki Sixx said of the line up, "This is what we imagined when we came up with the idea of Crüe Fest last summer – putting together the most kick ass bands on one bill for a day of rock. All of the bands on this tour  the others -- musically, theatrically and passionately."

Mötley Crüe announced that they would play the entire Dr. Feelgood album every night of Crüe Fest 2, to celebrate the album's 20th anniversary.

Second stage
A second stage was added to the festival through a partnership with Monster Energy. The second stage had five additional bands performing, with one of these being a local band picked by a local radio station. The local band opened the Monster Energy Stage of Crüe Fest 2. Cavo, Rev Theory, 16 Second Stare, and Shram were confirmed to be appearing on the second stage.

Setlist
Terror n Tinseltown
Dr. Feelgood 
Slice Of Your Pie
Rattlesnake Shake
Kickstart My Heart
Without You 
Same Ol' Situation (S.O.S.)
Sticky Sweet
She Goes Down
Don't Go Away Mad (Just Go Away)
Time For Change
Mick Solo
Wild Side 
Live Wire 
Saints Of Los Angeles 
Shout At The Devil 
Encore:
Home Sweet Home 
Girls, Girls, Girls

Tour dates

References

External links
 Motley.com
 Crüe Fest 2

Mötley Crüe concert tours
2009 concert tours
Summer festivals